Group Therapy is the second studio album by Alter Natives, released on June 20, 1988 by SST Records.

Track listing

Personnel 
Adapted from the Group Therapy liner notes.

Alter Natives
 Chris Bopst – bass guitar, kazoo, vocals, design
 Greg Ottinger – guitar
 Jim Thomson – drums, congas, tabla, percussion, vocals
 Eric Ungar – saxophone, flute, guitar

Production and design
 Eric Bopst – illustrations
 Richard Ford – mastering
 Adam Green – production, engineering

Release history

References

External links 
 
 Group Therapy at Bandcamp

1988 albums
Alter Natives albums
SST Records albums
Instrumental rock albums